This is a list of Swedish government ministries.

Current ministries 

 
Ministries